Oregocerata is a genus of moths belonging to the family Tortricidae.

Species
Oregocerata caucana Razowski & Brown, 2005
Oregocerata chrysodetis (Meyrick, 1926)
Oregocerata cladognathos Razowski, 1999
Oregocerata colossa Razowski & Wojtusiak, 2006
Oregocerata magna Razowski & Wojtusiak, 2009
Oregocerata medioloba Razowski & Wojtusiak, 2008
Oregocerata nigrograpta Razowski & Wojtusiak, 2008
Oregocerata orcula Razowski, 1988
Oregocerata quadrifurcata Razowski & Brown, 2005
Oregocerata recurrens Razowski & Wojtusiak, 2008
Oregocerata rhyparograpta Razowski & Becker, 2002
Oregocerata submontana Razowski & Brown, 2005
Oregocerata triangulana Razowski & Brown, 2005
Oregocerata zonalis Razowski & Becker, 2002

See also
List of Tortricidae genera

References

 , 2005: World catalogue of insects volume 5 Tortricidae.
 , 1988, Acta zoologica cracoviensia 31: 392.
 , 2006: Tortricidae from Venezuela (Lepidoptera: Tortricidae). Shilap Revista de Lepidopterologia 34 (133): 35–79. Full article: .
 , 2009: Tortricidae (Lepidoptera) from the mountains of Ecuador and remarks on their geographical distribution. Part IV. Eastern Cordillera. Acta Zoologica Cracoviensia 51B (1-2): 119–187. doi:10.3409/azc.52b_1-2.119-187. Full article: .

External links
tortricidae.com

Euliini
Tortricidae genera